Louise Carter (born Betty-Lee Carter; March 17, 1875 – November 10, 1957) was an American stage and film actress. She appeared in 48 films between 1924 and 1940, mostly in maternal supporting roles. Among her roles were the mother of Paul Muni in I Am a Fugitive from a Chain Gang (1932), the wife of Lionel Barrymore in Broken Lullaby (1932) and the wife of W. C. Fields in You're Telling Me! (1934).

Early years
Carter was born Betty-Lee Carter on March 17, 1875, in Denison, Iowa. Her parents, Lawrence "Louis" J. Carter and Philomine Richards Carter, were French-Canadian. She had five younger siblings, and she was a graduate of Denison High School.

Career 
By 1902, Carter had acted in Boston, New London, and New York City. She became the leading lady of the Gotham Stock Company in New York City in 1911. The company performed in Orpheum Company vaudeville houses owned by Percy G. Williams, who often had the cast of a play present it in one theater, then hurry to a second theater in the chain for another performance in the same evening. In 1928, Carter and her daughter Betty-Lee acted together in Skidding at the Bayes Theatre in New York City.

Carter also wrote plays, including the one-act The Soldiers, which was presented in Toronto by a stock touring company headed by Miss Percy Haswell. She went on to write at least six more plays. In 1931, Thomas Nelson and Sons published Bible Jingle Rymes, Carter's adaptation of Bible stories into "delightful children's verse".

Personal life 
When Carter was 21, she married Frederick Seymour. They had two daughters (the second of whom was named Betty-Lee Carter, like her mother and became an actress) before they separated. By that time Carter was living in Silver City, New Mexico, to which the rest of her family had moved. By 1915, the two had apparently divorced. She had married Cobrun Broun, and they were living in Toronto.

Partial filmography

 The Truth About Women (1924) - Bronson's Mother
 Scandal Street (1925) - Cora Forman
 The Lost Chord (1925) - Phyllis
 The Substitute Wife (1925) - Evelyn Wentworth
 In Borrowed Plumes (1926) - Clara Raymond
 Striving for Fortune (1926)
 Broken Lullaby (1932) - Frau Holderlin
 Are You Listening? (1932) - Mrs. O'Neil (uncredited)
 The Strange Case of Clara Deane (1932) - Couturiere (uncredited)
 Week-End Marriage (1932) - Mrs. Davis
 Stranger in Town (1932) - Mrs. Croaker (uncredited)
 The Last Mile (1932) - Mrs. Walters
 Blondie of the Follies (1932) - Ma Callahan
 Two Against the World (1932) - Mrs. Polansky (scenes deleted)
 Hell's Highway (1932) - Mrs. Ellis
 Trouble in Paradise (1932) - Woman with Wrong Handbag (uncredited)
 I Am a Fugitive from a Chain Gang (1932) - James Allen's Mother
 Tess of the Storm Country (1932) - Mrs. Garfield (uncredited)
 Madame Butterfly (1932) - Suzuki
 The Monkey's Paw (1933) - Mrs. White
 Ladies They Talk About (1933) - Lefty's Landlady (uncredited)
 Jennie Gerhardt (1933) - Mrs. Gerhardt
 Pilgrimage (1933) - Mrs. Rogers
 This Day and Age (1933) - Grace Smith
 Beauty for Sale (1933) - Mrs. Lawson
 Doctor Bull (1933) - Mrs. Ely, New Winton's Gossip (uncredited)
 Footlight Parade (1933) - Old Maid in Elevator in 'Honeymoon Hotel' (uncredited)
 The Right to Romance (1933) - First Face Lift Patient
 East of Fifth Avenue (1933) - Mrs. Mary Lawton
 Beloved (1934) - Mrs. Tarrant
 You're Telling Me! (1934) - Mrs. Bessie Bisbee
 Ready for Love (1934) - Mrs. Sarah Thompson (uncredited)
 Here Is My Heart (1934) - Charity Lady (uncredited)
 The Mystery of Edwin Drood (1935) - Mrs. Crisparkle (uncredited)
 Straight from the Heart (1935) - Mother in Breadline
 Party Wire (1935) - Grandma Kern (uncredited)
 Reckless Roads (1935) - Mrs. Adams
 Rose of the Rancho (1936) - Guadalupe
 Paddy O'Day (1936) - Aunt Jane
 The Bold Caballero (1936) - Indian woman (uncredited)
 The Last Train from Madrid (1937) - Rosa Delgado (uncredited)
 Angel (1937) - Flower Woman (uncredited)
 Inside Story (1939) - Dora
 Unmarried (1939) - Mrs. Charles
 Nancy Drew and the Hidden Staircase (1939) - Miss Floretta Turnbull
 Gone with the Wind (1939) - Bandleader's Wife (uncredited)
 Brother Orchid (1940) - Scrub Woman at End (uncredited) (final film role)

References

Bibliography
 Tag Gallagher. John Ford: The Man and His Films. University of California Press, 1988.

External links

Images (New York City Public Library)

1875 births
1957 deaths
American film actresses
American stage actresses